William Butcher (born January 6, 1995) is an American professional ice hockey defenseman for the Texas Stars of the American Hockey League (AHL) while under contract to the Dallas Stars of the National Hockey League (NHL). Butcher was selected in the fifth round, 123rd overall, by the Colorado Avalanche in the 2013 NHL Entry Draft.

Early life
Butcher was born on January 6, 1995, in Sun Prairie, Wisconsin to parents Joe and Julie.

Playing career
Butcher played college hockey at the University of Denver from 2013 to 2017. For his play in the 2016–17 season, Butcher won the Hobey Baker Award as the best player in men's college hockey. He was also named a NCHC First-Team All-Star, NCHC Player of the Year, and NCHC Offensive Defenseman of the Year for 2016–17. He helped Denver win the 2017 NCAA Championship.

On August 27, 2017, as an NHL free agent, Butcher signed a two-year, entry-level maximum contract with the New Jersey Devils worth an annual base salary of $925,000.

After participating in his first training camp with the Devils, Butcher made the Devils' opening night roster for the 2017–18 season. In the Devils' home opener, Butcher made his NHL debut against the Colorado Avalanche on October 7, 2017, a game in which he became the first Devils' player in franchise history to record three points in his debut, registering three assists on the power play in a 4–1 victory.

On July 31, 2019, Butcher signed a three-year contract extension with the Devils. On February 18, 2020, Butcher suffered a season-ending injury during the game between the Devils and St. Louis Blues. He appeared in 56 games, recording four goals and 17 assists during the 2019–20 season.

After completing his fourth season with the Devils, and with his role diminishing in each season, Butcher was traded by New Jersey along with a fifth-round draft pick in 2022 to the Buffalo Sabres on July 28, 2021. In the 2021–22 season, Butcher saw his offensive impact decrease for the fifth consecutive season, collecting two goals and eight points in just 37 games with the Sabres.

At the conclusion of his contract with Buffalo, Butcher was signed as a free agent to a one-year, two-way contract with the Dallas Stars on July 22, 2022.

International play

Butcher was named to the senior United States roster to compete at the 2018 IIHF World Championship.

Career statistics

Regular season and playoffs

International

Awards and honors

References

External links
 

1995 births
Living people
AHCA Division I men's ice hockey All-Americans
American men's ice hockey defensemen
Buffalo Sabres players
Colorado Avalanche draft picks
Denver Pioneers men's ice hockey players
Dubuque Fighting Saints players
Hobey Baker Award winners
Ice hockey players from Wisconsin
New Jersey Devils players
People from Sun Prairie, Wisconsin
Sportspeople from Madison, Wisconsin
Texas Stars players